Vasileia "Vaso" Mavrelou (born February 23, 1985) is a female Greek water polo player who was a member of the Greece women's national water polo team that won the Gold Medal at the 2005 FINA Women's Water Polo World League in Kirishi and the Bronze Medal at the 2010 World League in San Diego. She also competed in the 2006 European Water Polo Championship, where Greece finished in the 6th place.

At club level, she played for Olympiacos for 11 years (2002–2013), winning 2 Greek Championships and numerous European honours (2007–08 LEN Trophy runners-up, 2010–11 LEN Champions Cup third place among many others). She currently plays for Rethymno NC (2015–16 season).

References

1985 births
Living people
Greek female water polo players
Olympiacos Women's Water Polo Team players
Sportspeople from Chios
21st-century Greek women